Rush Medical College is the medical school of Rush University, located in the Illinois Medical District, about 3 km (2 miles) west of the Loop in Chicago. Offering a full-time Doctor of Medicine program, the school was chartered in 1837, and today is affiliated primarily with Rush University Medical Center, and nearby John H. Stroger Jr. Hospital of Cook County. In 2021, Rush Medical College was ranked 64th among research institutions in the U.S. by U.S. News & World Report.

History 

Rush Medical College was one of the first medical colleges in the state of Illinois and was chartered in 1837, two days before the city of Chicago was chartered, and opened with 22 students on December 4, 1843. Its founder, Dr. Daniel Brainard, named the school in honor of Dr. Benjamin Rush, the only physician with medical school training to be a signatory of the Declaration of Independence. He later taught Meriwether Lewis the basic medical skills for his expedition with William Clark to the Pacific Northwest. Dr. Rush was also known as the "Father of American Psychiatry".

During the early 1860s, Rush Medical College staff members started discussions on establishing a dental department. On March 12, 1869, a charter was issued to found the Chicago Dental College, which was intended to be Chicago's first dental school. All attempts to put this charter into operation failed, however, and an appeal was made to the Chicago Dental Society to become involved. As a result, on February 20, 1883, a charter was issued for the Chicago Dental Infirmary, which opened on March 12, 1883.

During the college's first century, more than 10,000 physicians received their training there. A "Rush Doctor" was a highly prized commodity in the American West of the 19th century. Rush Medical College was affiliated with the University of Chicago from 1898 until 1942.

With the onset of World War II, the medical college temporarily suspended its educational program, although it continued as an institution. Its faculty continued undergraduate and graduate teaching of medicine and the biological sciences as members of the faculty of the University of Illinois. The charter of the medical college was reactivated in 1969 when it became part of Rush-Presbyterian-St. Luke's Medical Center. In 1971, Rush Medical College reopened with a class of 66 first-year students and 33 third-year students.

Students 
For the 2016–2017 academic year, Rush Medical College was home to 515 medical students. For the entering class of 2016–2017, a total of 10,754 applications were received, with 138 students matriculating.

Curriculum 
The curriculum at Rush Medical College is academically challenging, rigorous and integrates all basic science and clinical components. In 2010, the Rush Medical College curriculum underwent an extensive transformation as it implemented a system-based curriculum. Each organ system is organized into an individual block that integrates material from anatomy, biochemistry, histology, physiology, microbiology, pathophysiology, immunology, and pharmacology. Preclinical years are graded as Pass/Fail, and clinical years are graded as Honors, High Pass, Pass, Fail. There are currently no external or internal rankings for preclinical students.

Concurrently, students in the first two years are enrolled in the EXPLORE Program. This program introduces students to various aspects of medicine and provides hands-on physical examination training. Students obtain clinical experience starting in the first weeks of school as they are required to work alongside a mentoring physician in any field of choice. An evidence-based medicine (EBM) course is included during the first and second year. A USMLE Step 1 passing score is required for promotion into the clinical years. USMLE Step 2 CK and CS must be taken by November 1 of the fourth year, and passing both is required for graduation.

Notable alumni 

 J. M. Adams – Member of the Wisconsin State Assembly in 1870
 Charles Erwin Booth – Member of the Wisconsin State Assembly
 Truman W. Brophy – Founder of Chicago Dental Infirmary
 Henry Arthur Callis – One of the founders of Alpha Phi Alpha
 Myron S. Cohen – Protocol chair for the HPTN 052 study which was regarded by the journal Science as the breakthrough of the year in 2011
 Ruth Darrow – physician who first identified the cause of hemolytic disease of the newborn
 Daniel Downs – Member of the Wisconsin State Assembly and of the Wisconsin State Senate
 Samuel Abbott Ferrin – Member of the Wisconsin State Assembly
 Morris Fishbein – Editor of JAMA from 1924 to 1950. He was notable for exposing quacks and debunking dubious medical practices.
 Evarts Graham – Thoracic surgeon best known for his research linking smoking to lung cancer
 James B. Herrick – physician who first described sickle cell anemia, and a type of myocardial infarction.
 Ernest E. Irons - president of the American Medical Association (AMA), the American College of Physicians and the American Association for the Study and Control of Rheumatic Diseases.
 Edwin Herman Lennette — virologist and pioneer of diagnostic virology
 Julian Herman Lewis – African-American pathologist known for his research on medicine and race
 Andrew Caldwell Mailer – Member of the Wisconsin State Senate from 1897 to 1901
 Robert E. Minahan – Mayor of Green Bay, Wisconsin
 Clem Neacy – End and tackle in the NFL, surgeon
 Dean Harold Noyes – Dean of Oregon Dental School
 David J. Peck – In 1847, became the first African American to receive a Doctor of Medicine degree from an American medical school
Benoni Reynolds – Member of the Wisconsin State Assembly in 1876 and of the Wisconsin State Senate from 1878 to 1879
James C. Reynolds – Member of the Wisconsin State Assembly and of the Wisconsin State Senate
 C. A. Robins – Governor of Idaho (1947–1951)
 Robert Holbrook Smith ("Dr. Bob") – Co-founder of Alcoholics Anonymous Bob Smith (doctor)
 Esther Somerfeld-Ziskind – neurologist and psychiatrist
 Benjamin H. Southworth – Physician and member of the University of Michigan 1901 National Championship football team.
 Michael Stuart – Mayo Clinic sports physician and orthopedic surgeon
 Henry Tazelaar – lung, heart and transplant pathologist
 Max Thorek - best known for founding the International College of Surgeons.
 Ruth May Tunnicliff – bacteriologist, medical researcher

See also 
 James Oliver Van de Velde, Bishop of Chicago, founder of hospital taken over by Rush Medical College
 Rush University Medical Center
 Rush University
Illinois Medical District
West Loop

References

Bibliography 

 Irons, Ernest E. (1953). The Story of Rush Medical College. Chicago: Board of Trustees of Rush Medical College.

External links
 
Guide to the Rush Medical College Records 1923-1941 at the University of Chicago Special Collections Research Center

 
Medical schools in Illinois
1837 establishments in Illinois
Educational institutions established in 1837